Fatima, who died in either 632 or 615–633, was the daughter of Islamic prophet Muhammad and is revered by Muslims.

Fatima, Fátima or Fatimah most often also refers to:
Our Lady of Fátima, a title of Virgin Mary based on several reported apparitions in Fátima, Portugal
Sanctuary of Fátima, a sanctuary dedicated to the apparitions

Fatima or Fátima may also refer to:

People
 Fatima (given name) and its variants, including a list of people with this name
 Fatima (surname list), list of people with this surname

Places
 Fátima, Buenos Aires, a country town in  Argentina
 Fátima, Bahia, a municipality in Brazil
 Fátima do Sul, a municipality in Mato Grosso do Sul, Brazil
 Bairro de Fátima, a neighborhood in Rio de Janeiro, Brazil
 Nossa Senhora de Fátima, Macau, a civil parish in Macau
 Fátima, Tocantins, a municipality in Brazil
 Fatima, a community of Les Îles-de-la-Madeleine, Quebec
 Fatima, Bohol, a barangay (neighborhood) in the Philippines
 Fatima, a barangay in San Miguel, Zamboanga del Sur, Philippines
 Fatima, Negros Oriental, a barangay (neighborhood) in the Philippines
 Fátima (Mexicable), an aerial lift station in Ecatepec, Mexico
 Fátima, a Medellín Metro rail and bus station
 Fátima, Portugal, a location of several reported apparitions of the Virgin Mary

Films and television
 Fatima (1938 film), a film from the Dutch East Indies
 Fatima (2015 film), a French film directed by Philippe Faucon
 Fatima (2020 film), a faith-based drama film directed by Marco Pontecorvo

Music
 "Fatima", a song by K'naan from his 2009 album Troubadour

Ships

 Fatima (1849 vessel), an English sailing vessel
 SS Fatima, a cargo vessel built in 1942

Other uses
 Fatima (cigarette), a brand of cigarettes popular in the United States during the middle of the 20th century
 C.D. Fátima, a football club in Fátima, Portugal
 Fatima College, a secondary school in Port of Spain, Trinidad and Tobago
 Anartia fatima, the banded peacock, a butterfly of Central and North America
 Fatima, pug of Queen Victoria
 Fatimas, fictional artificial life forms in The Five Star Stories
 Fatima, 1888 short story by Rudyard Kipling in Soldiers Three
 Fatima, wife of Bluebeard in some versions of the folktale
 Fatima, theme of Steins;Gate 0

See also
 Fatimid Caliphate, 909–1171
 Our Lady of Fátima (disambiguation)